Leo Roger Spurway Price (born 26 November 1945) is a former Australian politician. He was elected as a member of the Australian House of Representatives at the 1984 election, representing the Division of Chifley in western Sydney, for the Australian Labor Party until his retirement before the 2010 election.

Born in Sydney, Price was educated at the New South Wales Institute of Technology. He was an account manager with Telecom Australia before entering politics. He was an alderman on Blacktown City Council from 1981 until 1987 and served as deputy mayor in 1984–1985.

At the time of his retirement, Price was the longest-serving Labor member in the parliament (House or Senate).

Price served as Parliamentary Secretary to Prime Minister Bob Hawke from 4 June 1991 until 27 December 1991, when Paul Keating became Prime Minister. He then served as Parliamentary Secretary to the Minister for Defence until the March 1993 federal election. He was Opposition Chief Whip from 2004 until 29 November 2007, when he became the Chief Government Whip. Additionally, he has been a member of numerous Standing Committees and overseas parliamentary delegations.

Committees include: Foreign Affairs, Defence and Trade from 26 May 1993 to 31 August 2004 (Chair from 7 June 1995 to 29 January 1996); Certain Family Law Issues from 26 May 1993 (Chair from 26 May 1993) to 28 November 1995; Family and Community Affairs from 19 August 2003 to 31 August 2004; Migration from 10 May 2005 to 6 September 2005.

On 20 March 2010, Roger Price announced his intention to retire from politics at the 2010 federal election. After his retirement, he served as the Australian Consul-General to Chicago.

External links
Personal website

References

1945 births
Living people
Australian Labor Party members of the Parliament of Australia
Labor Right politicians
Members of the Australian House of Representatives
Members of the Australian House of Representatives for Chifley
Consuls-General of Australia in Chicago
21st-century Australian politicians
20th-century Australian politicians